Katsunuma may refer to:

Battle of Kōshū-Katsunuma, battle between pro-Imperial and Tokugawa shogunate forces during the Boshin War in Japan
Katsunuma, Yamanashi, town located in Higashiyamanashi District, Yamanashi, Japan
Katsunuma Nobutomo (died 1535), Japanese samurai of the Sengoku period
Katsunuma-budōkyō Station, railway station of Chūō Main Line, East Japan Railway Company

Japanese-language surnames